Hindustan Ki Kasam may refer to:
 Hindustan Ki Kasam (1973 film), an Indian war film
 Hindustan Ki Kasam (1999 film), an Indian action film